The 2017 Campeonato Acreano was the 71st season of Acre's top football league.

Format
First stage
Standard round-robin, in which all teams play each other once.
Last two teams are eliminated from the competition with the last one relegated to the second division.

Second stage
Standard round-robin, in which the six remaining teams play each other once.

Third stage (if necessary)
Home-and-away playoff with the winners of the first and second stages.

Qualification
The top two teams not already playing in Série A, Série B, or Série C, or already assured qualification to Série D qualify for the 2018 Campeonato Brasileiro Série D
The winner and runner-up qualify for the 2018 Copa do Brasil.
The winner qualifies for the 2018 Copa Verde.

Teams

Source:

First stage

Second stage

Finals

Atlético-AC win the 2017 Campeonato Acriano

Atlético-AC and Rio Branco qualify for the 2018 Campeonato Brasileiro Série D.Atlético-AC and Rio Branco qualify for the 2018 Copa do Brasil.Atlético-AC qualify for the 2018 Copa Verde.

References

Campeonato Acreano seasons
2017 in Brazilian football leagues